Navot Papushado (born 4 March 1980) is an Israeli film director and screenwriter.

Early life
Papushado was born in Haifa, Israel, to a Sephardic Jewish family. He resided in the northern Galilee community settlement of Yuvalim, Israel.

Directing career
In 2010, his directorial debut film Rabies (Kalevet) was released, a film which he co-wrote and co-directed with Aharon Keshales. In 2013, their second joint film Big Bad Wolves came out.

Filmography

Awards

References

External links

Living people
1980 births
Israeli film directors
Israeli Sephardi Jews
Israeli male screenwriters
People from Haifa
Tel Aviv University alumni